Ibinda (also Kibinda, Chibinda, Tchibinda, Cibinda) is ostensibly a Bantu language or a dialect group spoken in the Angolan province and exclave of Cabinda.

Ibinda is Western Kongo (Guthrie: H16d) as it is spoken in Cabinda.<ref>The dialect "of the region around the Kongo rapids is called Ki-kongo, or Mfiote." From "The Province of Angola." Report by Commercial Agent Chatelaine, of Loanda.  The Miscellaneous Documents of the House of Representatives for the Second Session of the Fifty-Second Congress 1892-'93. p.572.</ref>  It is a combination of several dialects of the Kongo language (Kikongo) spoken by small ethnic groups in Cabinda. Among the principal ones are Iwóyo, Ikuákongo (Kakongo), Ikóchi, Ilínji (Ilinge), Kiyómbe (Quiombe), Kisúndi and Ivili although some are sometimes considered separate from Ibinda.Jouni Filip Maho. "NUGL Online: The online version of the New Updated Guthrie List, a referential classification of the Bantu languages."  Version of 4 June 2009. p. 52.  Retrieved 15 January 2010.  Ibinda is a project of Cabindan separatists or nationalists who advocate the formation of a Republic of Cabinda and is the "national language" of the proposed state.  

Historically, vernacular speech in Cabinda has also been called Fiote, from m'fiôte'', a word meaning "black" or "colored person."  Fiote referred to all local languages of Cabinda "because they were the languages spoken by black people."  The term was also used to describe the inhabitants themselves and as an adjective meaning native or indigenous ("everything that was not of European origin was labeled 'fiote' – fiote papaya, mango fiote, potato fiote, etc.).  However, this term is considered derogatory and is eschewed by Cabindans.  "Cabindans do not like being called Fiote...[because] the word was used by the Portuguese to describe everything that was inferior – a bad road would be called a fiote road and bad food would be called fiote food."  Some argue that the language should be called *Cabindese.

References

External links
Omotola Akindipe, André Tati. Largest Ibinda language resource on the web (Mofeko)
Jouni Filip Maho. NUGL Online: The online version of the New Updated Guthrie List, a referential classification of the Bantu languages (with map), p. 52

Kongo language
Languages of Angola